The High Elevation Antarctic Terahertz telescope is a far-infrared telescope, established by the University of Arizona and the University of New South Wales located at Ridge A at an altitude of , considered the most ideal location for observation in the world. The extraordinary low humidity makes Inner Antarctica the best (by far) region for submillimeter astronomy observations. The telescope is robotic, remote controlled.

See also
 List of astronomical observatories
List of radio telescopes

References

Astronomical telescopes and observatories in the Antarctic
Infrared telescopes
2012 establishments in Antarctica